Sir Charles Bagot Chester (1724 – 1755) was the 7th baronet Chester of Chicheley, Buckinghamshire.

Early life and education
The son of Sir John Chester, 6th Baronet and Frances Bagot, Chester was born during 1724. He was educated at John Roysse's Free School in Abingdon, (now Abingdon School), Westminster School and later St John's College, Oxford. matriculated 4 November 1741.

Career
He was awarded an honorary degree, (Doctor of Civil Law) on 14 April 1749.

Peerage
He succeeded his father Sir John Chester, 6th Baronet, to the title on 8 February 1748. He was unmarried but had two children to mistresses. His will (dated 21 May 1755) was proven (by probate) on 27 May 1755. He was buried on 29 May 1755 at Chicheley, Buckinghamshire. The title went to his cousin Sir Francis Chester, 8th Baronet on his death.

See also
 List of Old Abingdonians

References

1724 births
1755 deaths
People educated at Abingdon School
People educated at Westminster School, London
Alumni of St John's College, Oxford